The United States Polo Association (USPA) is the national governing body for the sport of polo in the United States.

Introduction
Established in 1890, by David Grubbs the USPA provides resources to over 4,500 individual members and 250 polo clubs across the U.S. and Canada, including promoting the game of polo, coordinating the activities of its member clubs and registered players, arranging and supervising polo tournaments, competitions and games and providing rules, handicaps and conditions for those tournaments, competitions and games, including the safety and welfare of participants and mounts.  The first chairman of the USPA was H.L. Herbert (1890-1921).  The first chief executive officer was Peter J. Rizzo (2011-2015).

The USPA has established a number of programs for new players to learn the sport in the U.S. including Regional Polo Centers and clubs that host schools and lessons across the country. In 2010, the USPA created Team USPA, a program to enhance and grow the sport of polo in the U.S. by identifying young, talented American players and providing mentored training and playing opportunities leading to a pool of higher rated amateur and professional players. The organization also coordinates youth polo programs and competitions through Interscholastic/Intercollegiate polo 
 and Pony Club.

In 2012, “60 Minutes”  aired a special feature on polo's resurgence in America and included several interviews with dedicated players and ambassadors in the United States. The segment highlighted one of the USPA's specialty programs, Work to Ride www.worktoride.net, which is dedicated to helping inner-city youth in Philadelphia through polo and other equine activities.

Chairmen
David Grubbs, 1921 to 1936
Elbridge T. Gerry, Sr., 1940-1946
Robert Early Strawbridge, Jr., 1946-1950
Devereux Milburn, 1950-1960
George C. Sherman, Jr., 1960-1966
Northrup R. Knox, 1966-1970
William T. Ylvisaker, 1970-1975
Hugo Dalmar, 1975-1976
Norman Brinker, 1976-1980
William Sinclaire, 1980-1984
Summerfield Johnston, Jr., 1984-1988
John C. Oxley, 1988-1991
Stephen A. Orthwein 1991 to 1995
Richard C. Riemenschneider 1995 to 1999
Orrin H. Ingram II 1999-2003
Jack L. Shelton 2003-2007
Thomas Biddle, Sr. 2007-2011
Charles Weaver 2011-2015
Joseph P. Meyer 2015-present

History

Polo was first played in the United States in 1876, introduced by James Gordon Bennett, Jr. (May 10, 1841 – May 14, 1918), who had first observed the game played in England. Bennett came to be known as the father of American polo as it was he who assembled the players, knowledge, equipment and Texas horses to play the first loosely structured matches in the United States. During that winter of 1876, the first game was held indoors at Dickel's Riding Academy in New York and the first formal U.S. club was established, the Westchester Polo Club.

Westchester alternated seasons between New York City and Newport, Rhode Island before making Newport its permanent home. On May 13, 1876, the Jerome Park Racetrack in Westchester County (future home of the New York Giants baseball team and hence the name “polo grounds”) was the site of the first outdoor polo match. Then in 1879 Meadowbrook became a polo club and began play on the Mineola fairgrounds of Long Island. The foundation had now been laid for American polo and the sport was here to stay and flourish.

As players and teams proliferated, the development of the sport demanded a governing body. The Polo Association (later known as the United States Polo Association), with H.L. Herbert serving as first chairman, was founded March 21, 1890. The USPA's purpose was to coordinate games, standardize rules and establish handicaps. Mr. Herbert was credited with instituting a handicapping system in 1888 so that teams could be more evenly matched in games.  His rating system is essentially the same today, with player handicaps spanning minus one through 10, with 10 being highest handicap. H.L. Herbert, with W.A. Hazard as his dedicated assistant, continued to guide the Association until 1921. Hazard then followed as USPA Chairman until 1922.

The first USPA headquarters was appropriately located in New York, the center of polo at that time. The Association began operations on a voluntary basis of committee structure and continues as such today with a small office staff. Elected Officers and Governors serve annually along with appointed Committee Members.

USPA membership originally included seven clubs and, the following year, 142 players registered and there were five new clubs.  In its early days of organization, the Association initiated changes in the number and length of time periods (chukkers) in a match. Equipment became standardized and pony training improved significantly. Scoring was also adjusted to allow for fractioning of points for penalties—later abolished as an unnecessarily complex method of scoring that was replaced with free shots. Even before the Association was formed, the Westchester Cup, one of the oldest tournaments in the world, was contested in 1886 by the United States and Britain. This prestigious international polo tournament was played at the time when the Kentucky Derby, Wimbledon and the British Open were all new events in a sparse sporting calendar. Though the British won that first match at Westchester easily, the Americans would use the defeat as a catalyst to improve their game strategy and the quality of their horses. The Association continued the series and the United States won nine of the next eleven matches including the 1939 competition, when the tournament was played for the last time at Meadowbrook before a crowd of 40,000. The Cup was not played again until 1988, when the United States defeated an Australasian team in Lexington, Kentucky. The U.S. won again against England in 1992 and later lost to the British in 1997.

In 1904 another important tournament evolved, the United States Open. The first Open was won by the Wanderers, who scored 4-1/2 to the Freebooters 3. The tournament resumed in 1910 and continued every year with the exception of 1911, 1915, 1917, 1918, and 1942-1945.  The U.S. Open Polo Championship® would become polo's most prestigious tournament still played annually and most recently at the International Polo Club – West Palm Beach, Florida.

The excitement of the sport was contagious; many of the early polo matches in the 1920s and 1930s attracted as many as 20,000 spectators. This would be an impressive attendance even by today's standards, yet when one considers the communication and transportation capabilities of that era it was truly incredible. The center of much of this excitement was Meadowbrook Polo Club in Westbury, NY, the site of many of the first U.S. Open and Westchester Cup Championships. During the 1913-14 season, the Westchester Cup packed 20,000 spectators into the stands. Even as polo gained in popularity across the country, eventually extending west to Texas, California and Hawaii, Meadowbrook would dominate the sport and be the center of polo during the first half of the century.

During these early years of the USPA, one of the more famous players in polo was Foxhall Keene, handicapped for 14 years at 10 goals, and then 16 years at 9 goals. Though there were many other greats, four players stood out in the 1890s and early 1920s.  They were: Harry Payne Whitney, the Waterbury brothers, Larry, Monty and Devereux Milburn.  These four players were known as the original “Big Four” and won the Westchester Cup in 1909, 1911, and 1913.  Milburn would go on to play in seven international matches and established a reputation as one of the most outstanding players of all time.  Credited with creating and leading the “Big Four”, Harry Payne Whitney played a pivotal role in the sport by helping develop a more fluid open form of play integrating better teamwork.

By 1913, Circuit Cup play began with the first USPA Inter-circuit Cup held in 1916. The USPA claimed 1,407 members and began registration of the ponies as well though pony registration would later be dropped in the 1920s. College polo came of age and indoor polo grew in popularity championed by George Sherman and Robert A. Graviss. Contributing to the growth of polo during this period was the U.S. Army, who after joining the USPA in 1902, encouraged their members to participate in polo to improve their riding ability. From that time until World War II, the military would play a significant role in growing and sustaining the sport of polo by adding significant numbers of players and polo ponies.

Polo's greatest era began in the years between the first and second World Wars. The sport not only survived the Great Depression, but expanded into the 1930s with increased international competition. The number of registered clubs had increased to 88 and playing membership was 2,889, of which 1,276 were military players. Louis Stoddard, a ten-goal player and member of two Westchester Cup Championship teams served as Chairman from 1922 to 1936. He would direct and expand the USPA during the period of great change. Other great names in polo emerged, such as ten-goaler Tommy Hitchcock, Jr., who reigned for 20 years and captured America's hearts.  Both of Hitchcock's parents were strong supporters of polo; his mother taught young children the game and coached many polo players to greatness. Thomas Hitchcock, Sr. was also an outstanding player who was rated at ten goals in 1891.

By 1928, another international match, The Cup of the Americas, was initiated between highly rated teams from the U.S. and Argentina. The U.S. Team won the first two competitions; however, from 1936, Argentina would go on to be the victor in future matches. The 1930s also saw women creating an impact on the sport, though they would not become official USPA members for years to come.

During polo's heyday it was only fitting that Hollywood would become involved with this great sport. With a wonderful climate for the game and the appeal for movie stars and moguls, California polo expanded. The geographic spread of polo led to the first East-West match up in 1933, with the West winning two of three matches, proving the Westerners were a force with which to be reckoned. Humorist Will Rogers, a talented player and supporter of polo was thrilled. He is still remembered today as saying, “The hillbillies beat the dudes and took the polo championship right out of the drawing room and into the bunkhouse”.

The Great Depression eventually took its toll on the fabric of American society and polo, like most things, faced some dire times. As World War II began, the number of civilian players dropped from 1600 to 750. Though the number of military players peaked in 1940 with 1,432 registered members, Army polo would later disappear as the mechanization of the era outmoded the need for the cavalry. From 1942-1945 USPA tournaments were not played, though polo continued on private fields. Chairman, R.E. Strawbridge, Jr., headed the Association from 1936-1940, followed by Elbridge T. Gerry to 1946 and then Strawbridge served again from 1946-1950.

Polo survived after the war, thanks in great part to Cecil Smith of Plano, Texas, considered one of the first “professional” or paid players. By 1950, the number of active clubs was 56 with 614 USPA playing members.  Devereux Milburn, Jr., son of the great 10-goal star, served as Chairman of the Association from 1950 to 1960. The early 1950s also marked the closing of Meadowbrook to make way for a highway; Meadowbrook  relocated to Jericho, Long Island. The club would never regain its earlier dominance.

A new star was on the horizon—Oak Brook in Chicago, Illinois. When the first U.S. Open was played there in the 1950s, the ascent of Oak Brook began and continued as American interest in polo revived during the 1960s. USPA clubs increased to 77 and 675 players were registered. The Indoor Polo Association combined with the USPA in 1954.  Indoor polo, also known as arena polo - expanded the scope of the sport and intercollegiate polo made a comeback with George C. Sherman, Jr. serving as USPA Chairman from 1960 to 1966.  In 1967 the USPA moved its headquarters from New York to Oak Brook, the new home of American polo. This era also marked the introduction of sponsor money for horses and professional players. With the help of William T. Ylvisaker, the Polo Training Foundation was established in 1967 for the purpose of raising donations for the purposes of teaching polo fundamentals and improving the sport.

In 1970 the Association listed 100 clubs and 917 registered players. Northrup R. Knox would head the USPA from 1966 to 1970, followed by William Ylvisaker 1970-1975 and Hugo Dalmar, Jr.  1975-1976. The early 1970s brought about increased popularity in polo's major tournaments and in the club ranks. Polo flourished in Florida, encouraged by John T. Oxley's interest in high-goal polo and William T. Ylvisaker's promotion of the sport by courting corporate sponsorship. International play increased as the Camacho Cup, played at Juarez, Mexico, was revived. Norman Brinker closed out the decade as USPA Chairman from 1976 to 1980.

Polo evolved from a society sport to include a far broader base of budget-minded horsemen, professional players and commercial sponsorship. With William Sinclaire as Chairman in 1980, the USPA registered 134 clubs and almost 1,400 players. Sinclaire was followed by S.K. Johnston, Jr. as Chairman from 1984 to 1988 who oversaw the move of the USPA offices to Lexington, KY. With the dominance of Oak Brook fading, the polo centers of the 1980s grew to include Florida, Texas and California.

In 1986 the United States Polo Association moved its national headquarters to a more central location in the heart of thoroughbred country, Lexington, KY. Pride and spectator interest were at a high point, particularly after the 1989 Federation of International Polo World Championship in West Berlin, Germany. Eight teams from all over the world battled with the U.S. team riding away as the victor over Britain in the final match. Led by Chairman, John C. Oxley (1988-1991) prior to and during the Centennial year of the United States Polo Association, one looked back fondly at the memories and heritage of yesteryear and forward with anticipation to another glorious 100 years. Since that time, Chairmen Stephen A. Orthwein (1991-1995), Richard C. Riemenschneider (1995-1999), Orrin H. Ingram (1999-2003), Jack Shelton(2003-2007), Thomas Biddle, Sr. (2007-2011) and Charles Weaver (2011- 2015) have made great strides in the areas of umpiring, safety, rules, rules interpretation, development of international rules, and refinement of the handicapping process.  The USPA national headquarters moved from Lexington KY. and are currently located In Lake Worth, FL.

The USPA completed two major strategic planning efforts (2005 and 2011) that resulted in many new and innovative programs and services that were designed to grow and sustain the sport. The establishment of a professional leadership staff was a main objective of the strategic planning sessions.  Polo continues to grow stronger, with current membership exceeding 4,500 members, many of whom are women players. Over two hundred fifty clubs and intercollegiate and interscholastic schools are registered with the USPA. Continued growth at the collegiate level assures a bright future as polo's strength depends on these young players of tomorrow.

See also
Museum of Polo and Hall of Fame
Arena polo

References

External links
 Official United States Polo Association website

 
1890 establishments in the United States
Sports organizations established in 1890
Polo governing bodies
Organizations based in Florida